I Do... Until I Don't is a 2017 American comedy film written and directed by Lake Bell. The film stars Bell, Ed Helms, Mary Steenburgen, Paul Reiser, Amber Heard, Dolly Wells, and Wyatt Cenac. The film was released on September 1, 2017, by The Film Arcade.

Plot
After a bad breakup, documentary filmmaker Vivian arrives in Florida in search of couples who are about to split, with a theory that marriage should last for only seven years, with an option to renew. The film shows three different marriages: Alice and Noah, who are struggling to get pregnant, Cybil and Harvey, an older couple who have been married for years, and polyamorous hippies Fanny and Zander.

Cast  
 Lake Bell as Alice Brewing
 Ed Helms as Noah Brewing
 Mary Steenburgen as Cybil Burger
 Paul Reiser as Harvey Burger
 Amber Heard as Fanny
 Wyatt Cenac as Zander
 Dolly Wells as Vivian Prudeck
 Chace Crawford as Egon
 Hannah Friedman as Millie
 Connie Shin as Mel
 Chauntae Pink as Bonnie
 Rae Gray as Lyn

Production
The working title What's the Point? was used before the film's release. On March 23, 2016, it was announced Lake Bell and Ed Helms would star in the film. On April 7, 2016, it was announced Mary Steenburgen, Paul Reiser, Amber Heard, Dolly Wells and Chace Crawford had joined of the cast of the film. Principal photography began on April 3, 2016, and ended on April 29, 2016.

Release
The film was released on September 1, 2017, by The Film Arcade.

Critical response
On Rotten Tomatoes, the film has an approval rating of 28% based on 65 reviews, with an average rating of 4.2/10. The site's critical consensus reads, "I Do... Until I Don't misses opportunities for fresh observations, settling instead for a middle of the road romantic comedy lacking memorable characters or real emotional stakes." On Metacritic, the film has a weighted average score of 43 out of 100, based on 18 critics, indicating "mixed or average reviews".

References

External links
 

2017 films
2017 romantic comedy films
American romantic comedy films
Films directed by Lake Bell
2010s English-language films
2010s American films